The Luck of the Irish is a 2001 American Disney Channel original movie. It stars Ryan Merriman, Alexis Lopez, Timothy Omundson, and Henry Gibson. It premiered on Disney Channel on March 9, 2001.

Plot
With his lucky gold coin on his side, 15-year-old Kyle Johnson (Ryan Merriman) gets everything in life, and is also the best basketball player on his team. Heritage Day is approaching and every time Kyle asks where his family came from, his parents, Kate and Bob (Marita Geraghty and Paul Kierman) change the subject. He finds out that his dad changed his last name, but doesn't know why. One day, Kyle and his best friend, Russell Halloway (Glenndon Chatman) go to an Irish festival. There he sees coins just like his and wonders if he's Irish. When Kyle can't stop step dancing during Seamus McTieran (Timothy Omundson) and the Saint of the Step's show, he gets knocked down.

The next morning, Kyle wakes up and notices something is different about him. At breakfast, his mother is acting differently, and she confesses to him that they are Irish. On his way to school, his day of bad luck starts to begin. The next day, Kyle begins to notice the changes more noticeably; he's shorter, and his hair is turning red. In science class, a magnet attaches to his coin, and he realizes that his lucky gold coin was stolen. He rushes home to tell his parents and walks in to see that his mother has shrunk to one foot tall. She reveals to him that she is really a leprechaun and that he is one too. He tells them who he thinks stole it, and his mom says that was his grandfather, Reilly O'Reilly, founder of the Emerald Isle potato chip company. Kate and her father had a falling out over her having a "mixed marriage". They all go to the factory to ask for the coin back. After being kicked out by security, Kyle sneaks in with the Young Achievers group from school. A girl from school, Bonnie Lopez (Alexis Lopez) asks why he is there, and he tells her. They get chased by security and end up getting caught by his grandfather. Turns out Reilly didn't steal it. Reilly tells him that this is their family's lucky coin. The youngest must have possession of it so all the leprechauns in the O'Reilly clan can pass as humans. Bonnie tells Kyle that his ears have changed, and are now pointy. Reilly starts to grow a beard.

They figure out that Seamus must have stolen the coin at the fair, so they go chase him down. Kyle's grandfather tells him that Seamus is an evil leprechaun. On their way, they come across Russell, who joins them. After Seamus and his gang get away, they track down their camper at the end of a rainbow. While they are distracted eating dinner, Kyle and Reilly sneaked into the camper and found the coin. Sensing what's going on, Seamus captures Reilly and will only let him go if Kyle gives him the coin. Kyle wagers a bet to keep both. He bets on sports. The three of them, plus Russell and Seamus' friends, magically end up in Ireland. Kyle and Russell have to compete against them in Gaelic sports. They end up tying, but Seamus refuses to set Reilly free. Kyle risks his freedom and bets on Seamus in basketball without using his lucky coin. They are then transported to the junior high state championship game. Only Kyle, his family, and his friends are aware that they are playing against Seamus and his friends. Russell scores the game winning shot, Reilly is set free, and Seamus has to spend eternity at the land of Kyle's father (within the shores of Lake Erie). Kyle realizes that he doesn't need luck.

The movie ends at the school talent show with Kyle embracing his heritage by Irish dancing and singing "This Land is Your Land" with Bonnie.

Cast
 Ryan Merriman as Kyle Johnson
 Henry Gibson as Reilly O'Reilly
 Alexis Lopez as Bonnie Lopez
 Paul Kiernan as Bob Johnson / Robert Smith
 Marita Geraghty as Kate O'Reilly Johnson / Kate Smith
 Glenndon Chatman as Russell Halloway
 Timothy Omundson as Seamus McTiernen
 Thurl Bailey as Mr. Halloway
 Duane Stephens as Patrick
 Charles Halford as McDermot
 Marshall Hilliard as Eddie McGuire
 Stan Ellsworth as Basketball Coach
 David Wee as Extra
 Chris Lovett as Extra
 Brittany Koppy (BK) as Extra
 Kevin Clifford as Garbage Man
 Ben Dino as Basketball Player #31

Production
Parts of the movie were filmed at Lagoon in Farmington, Utah.

Reception
TBA

Release
The television film premiered on Disney Channel on March 9, 2001.

Remake
In 2012, Luck Luck Ki Baat was remade into an Indian television film directed by Iqbal Khan, featuring Satyajeet Dubey and Mahesh Thakur in the lead roles.

References

External links

2001 television films
2001 films
American basketball films
American comedy television films
Disney Channel Original Movie films
Films about Irish-American culture
Films about shapeshifting
Films about size change
Films directed by Paul Hoen
Films shot in Utah
Leprechaun films
2000s American films